The Adam Range is a mountain range on Île Vanier, Nunavut, Canada. It is one of the many mountain ranges in the Canadian Arctic that make up the Arctic Cordillera mountain system.

See also
List of mountain ranges

References

Arctic Cordillera
Mountain ranges of Qikiqtaaluk Region
Mountains of Canada under 1000 metres